The 2019 Northern Stars season saw the Northern Stars netball team compete in the 2019 ANZ Premiership. With a team coached by Kiri Wills, captained by Leana de Bruin and featuring Temepara Bailey, Storm Purvis and Maia Wilson, Stars finished the regular season in third place behind Central Pulse and Southern Steel. In the elimination final, Stars defeated Steel 53–56. However, in the grand final, they lost 52–48 to Pulse, finishing the season in second place overall.

Players

Player movements

2019 roster

Pre-season
Northern Stars participated in the official ANZ Premiership pre-season tournament at Te Wānanga o Raukawa in Otaki on February 8–10.

Regular season

Fixtures and results
Round 1

Round 2

Round 3

Round 4

Round 5

Round 6

Round 7

Round 8

Round 9

Round 10

Round 11

Round 12

Round 13

Final standings

Finals Series

Elimination final

Grand final

References

2019
2019 ANZ Premiership season
2019 in New Zealand netball